Highlands Union Bank was a financial institution based in Abingdon, Virginia and founded in 1985. In 2019 it was announced that First Community Bank and Highlands Union Bank were to merge. As a result all existing Highlands Union Bank locations were renamed to First Community Bank.

The first HUB office was started by 600 investors in an attempt to form a local bank for their community. Highlands Union Banks assets grew to $9.2 million in their first year in business. Immediately prior to the First Community Bank merger, the bank boasted 15 locations in the Tennessee, Virginia, and North Carolina Tri-state area.

References

Banks based in Virginia